St Michael's Church is a Church of England parish church in Heighington, Darlington, County Durham. The church is a grade I listed building.

History
The earliest parts of the tower, nave, and chancel date from before the Norman conquest (IE pre-1066). In circa 1160/1170, the chancel was rebuilt and a third stage was added to the tower. A vestry was added in the 13th century. The chantry chapel, originally dating to the 13th century, was extended in the 14th century to form the south aisle. In the 15th century, a parapet was added to the tower.

The church was altered during the Victorian restoration period. Restorations took place in the 1840s, and then under Ewan Christian from 1872 to 1875.

On 20 March 1967, the church was designated a grade I listed building.

Present day
St Michael's is part of the parish of Herrington in the Archdeaconry of Auckland of the Diocese of Durham. St Michael's stands in the Central tradition of the Church of England. It currently holds joint Anglican/Methodist services.

References

External links
 A Church Near You entry

Church of England church buildings in County Durham
Grade I listed churches in County Durham
Churches in the Borough of Darlington
11th-century church buildings in England
Michael